Edward Joseph Derwinski (September 15, 1926 – January 15, 2012) was an American politician who served as the first Cabinet-level United States Secretary of Veterans Affairs, serving under President George H. W. Bush from March 15, 1989 to September 26, 1992. He previously served as a member of the United States House of Representatives from 1959 to 1983, representing south and southwest suburbs of Chicago.

Early life
He was born in Chicago, Illinois, on September 15, 1926, to Sophia Zmijewski and Casimir Ignatius Derwinski, who died in 1947.  Derwinski attended Loyola University of Chicago. Derwinski served in the United States Army in the Pacific Theater during World War II and in the postwar U.S. occupation of Japan. He graduated from Loyola University Chicago in 1951. He was a celebrated member of Alpha Delta Gamma National Fraternity.

Legislative career
In 1957, he was elected to the Illinois House of Representatives, where he served one term before winning election to the U.S. House of Representatives in 1958. He served 12 terms as a Republican representative from the 4th District of Illinois, a suburban region south and west of Chicago, eventually becoming ranking member of the House Foreign Relations Committee. He also served as a delegate to the United Nations General Assembly 1971-1972 and as chairman of the U.S. delegation to the Interparliamentary Union from 1970–1972 and 1978-1980.

Executive career
A Democratic redistricting plan after the 1980 Census carved up the 4th District, with only about 15% of its territory being retained and added to various territory from other districts; Derwinski and fellow Republican congressman George M. O'Brien were placed in the same district, and O'Brien won the 1982 primary on the strength of having more of his previous district included in the new configuration. After Derwinski's loss, President Ronald Reagan appointed him Counselor to the State Department. In 1987, Reagan appointed him Under Secretary of State for Security Assistance, Science and Technology, where he served until the end of Reagan's term, shortly after which he was appointed Administrator of Veterans Affairs, in charge of the Veterans Administration, which was elevated to cabinet-level status as the Department of Veterans Affairs in 1989, making Derwinski the first Secretary of Veterans Affairs.

Advocacy
A Polish American, Derwinski was noted for his efforts on behalf of Eastern Europe throughout his career. Notably, he aided in the rehabilitation of the Serbian Royalist general Draža Mihailović. Mihailović had received the Legion of Merit for his resistance efforts against the Axis—but this information was marked "secret" at the behest of the State Department so as not to harm relations with Marshal Tito, the current ruler of Yugoslavia in 1967. Tito was Mihailović's rival in World War II, and after Tito's forces emerged triumphant, Mihailović was accused of collaboration with the Nazis and executed. At the urging of airmen involved in Operation Halyard who had been saved by Mihailović's forces and had heard rumors of the award to him, Derwinski insisted that the State Department make the text of President Truman's citation public, confirming that Mihailović had not collaborated. Derwinski served as head of "Ethnic Americans for Dole/Kemp" during the 1996 presidential election.

Post-politics
Derwinski resided in Glen Ellyn, Illinois with his wife, the former Bonita Hickey, known as Bonnie. He had two adult children, Maureen and Michael, from his first marriage to Patricia Derwinski.

On January 15, 2012, Derwinski died at a nursing home from Merkel cell carcinoma, a rare form of skin cancer.  He was 85 years old. Derwinski was buried in Arlington National Cemetery in Arlington, Virginia.

On learning of his death, former United States Senator Peter Fitzgerald (R-IL) described Derwinski as "a giant in Illinois politics ... [H]e had incredible connections in all the different ethnic neighborhoods in Chicago, he was really loved by everybody on both sides".

References

External links

Congressional Record: Tribute to Ed Derwinski by Dan Rostenkowski, May 17, 1990

|-

|-

|-

|-

1926 births
2012 deaths
20th-century American politicians
United States Army personnel of World War II
American people of Polish descent
Deaths from cancer in Illinois
Deaths from Merkel-cell carcinoma
George H. W. Bush administration cabinet members
Republican Party members of the Illinois House of Representatives
Military personnel from Illinois
Politicians from Chicago
Republican Party members of the United States House of Representatives from Illinois
United States Army soldiers
United States Department of Veterans Affairs officials
United States Secretaries of Veterans Affairs
United States Under Secretaries of State
Burials at Arlington National Cemetery